Meng Wanzhou (born 13 February 1972), also known as Cathy Meng and Sabrina Meng,  also informally known in China as the "Princess of Huawei", is a Chinese business executive. She is the deputy chair of the board and chief financial officer (CFO) of Huawei which was founded by her father Ren Zhengfei.

On 1 December 2018, Meng was arrested at Vancouver International Airport. On 28 January 2019, the U.S. Department of Justice unsealed an indictment that charged her under bank and wire fraud, as well as conspiracies to commit such, in relationship to financial transactions conducted by Skycom, which had functioned as Huawei's Iran-based subsidiary, in violation of U.S. sanctions. On 24 September 2021, the Department of Justice announced it had reached a deal with Meng to resolve the case through a deferred prosecution agreement. As part of the deal, Meng agreed to a "statement of facts" that she had made untrue statements about Huawei's relationship with Skycom and that Skycom conducted transactions through HSBC that cleared through the U.S., at least some of which supported Huawei's work in Iran in violation of U.S. law; however, she did not have to pay a fine or plead guilty to her key charges. The Department of Justice said it would move to dismiss all charges against Meng when the deferral period ends on 21 December 2022, on the condition that Meng is not charged with any other crime before then. Meng left Canada for China on 24 September 2021. On 1 December 2022, the prosecution asked a judge to dismiss bank fraud and other charges against her and the judge dismissed the charges the next day.

Early life and education 
Meng Wanzhou was born 13 February 1972 in Chengdu, Sichuan, China. She is the daughter of Ren Zhengfei and his first wife, Meng Jun. She adopted her mother's surname when she was 16.

After graduating from college in 1992, she worked for China Construction Bank for a year before joining Huawei, a startup founded by her father, as a secretary. She attended graduate school in 1997 and earned a master's degree in accounting from the Huazhong University of Science and Technology. She moved to Vancouver, Canada, and obtained permanent residency in 2001, but her Confirmation of Permanent Residence expired in 2009. Meng also has had Hong Kong permanent residence since at least 2011.

Career 

In an interview with the Chinese newspaper 21st Century Business Herald, she said her career took off after she returned to Huawei in 1998 to work in the finance department. She held positions including head of international accounting, chief financial officer (CFO) of Huawei Hong Kong, and director of the Accounting Management Department.

When Huawei first published the names of its top executives in 2011, Meng was already listed as its CFO. In March 2018, she was appointed as one of the four vice chairpersons of the board, fueling speculation that she was being groomed to eventually succeed her father. However, Ren has denied such claims, telling Sina Tech that "none of my family members possess [suitable] qualities" and "will never be included in the sequence of successors."

As of December 2018, Meng is the deputy chairwoman and CFO of Huawei, China's largest privately held company, with 180,000 employees. In 2017, Forbes ranked Meng 8th in its list of Outstanding Businesswomen of China, while Huawei chairwoman Sun Yafang (who stepped down in March 2018) was ranked 2nd.

On 25 October 2021, video clips showing Meng being welcomed back by Huawei employees at the Shenzhen headquarters circulated prompting confirmation that Meng had resumed work after completing a compulsory 21-day COVID-19 quarantine. She also celebrated her father's 77th birthday on the same day.

Extradition case

On 1 December 2018, Meng was detained upon arrival at Vancouver International Airport by Canada Border Services Agency officers for questioning, which lasted three hours. The Royal Canadian Mounted Police subsequently arrested her on a provisional U.S. extradition request for fraud and conspiracy to commit fraud in order to circumvent U.S. sanctions against Iran.

On 28 January 2019, the U.S. Department of Justice formally announced financial fraud charges against Meng. The first stage of the extradition hearing for Meng began Monday 20 January 2020 and concluded on 27 May 2020 when a BC Court ordered the extradition to proceed. On 13 February 2020, Meng was personally indicted by the U.S. Department of Justice on charges of trade secrets theft.

During the extradition courtroom proceedings, Meng's lawyers made several allegations against the prosecution, including allegations of unlawful detention of Meng, unlawful search and seizure, extradition law violations, misrepresentation, international law violation, and fabricated testimonies by the CBSA. each of which were responded to by the prosecution. In August 2021, the extradition judge questioned the regularity of the case and expressed great difficulty in understanding how the Record of Case (ROC) presented by the US supported their allegation of criminality.

On 18 September 2021, The Globe and Mail, citing Canadian sources, reported that the U.S. Department of Justice had a talk with Huawei and the lawyers representing Meng and had offered to end the extradition request and criminal proceedings if Meng pleaded "guilty" to the charges and paid a large fine.

On 24 September 2021, the Department of Justice announced it had reached a deal with Meng to resolve their case against her by deferring their criminal charges and withdrawing their extradition request after she entered into a deferred prosecution agreement with them. As part of the deal, Meng agreed to a statement of facts, admitting she had made untrue statements about Huawei concealing its link to Skycom and operating it in violation of US sanctions against Iran, but was allowed to formally deny her key charges and did not have to pay a fine. The Department of Justice said it would move to dismiss all the charges against Meng when the deferral period ends on 21 December 2022, on the condition that Meng is not charged with a crime before then. Meng left Vancouver on the same day aboard a Chinese government-arranged Air China charter flight bound for Shenzhen, Guangdong, China after spending more than 1000 days under house arrest in the city as part of her bail condition. She arrived and was greeted to a hero's welcome at the Shenzhen Bao'an International Airport on 25 September 2021.

On 1 December 2022, the prosecution asked a judge to dismiss bank fraud and other charges against her, and the judge dismissed the charges.

Personal life
Meng's mother is Ren Zhengfei's first wife, Meng Jun, who is the daughter of Meng Dongbo, a former deputy secretary of East China Military and Administrative Committees and deputy governor of Sichuan Province. She has a younger brother Ren Ping (formerly Meng Ping), who also works for Huawei. After divorcing Meng Jun, Ren Zhengfei married Yao Ling, with whom he had another daughter, Annabel Yao, who is 25 years younger than Meng. Annabel Yao made a high-profile debut at Le Bal des Débutantes in Paris in November 2018.

In 2007, Meng married businessman Liu Xiaozong, who formerly worked for Huawei for ten years and the couple have a daughter. Meng also has three sons from a previous marriage.

Meng and her husband own two multimillion-dollar residences in Vancouver, British Columbia. From 2001 to 2009, Meng was a permanent resident of Canada.

According to media reports, Meng has high blood pressure, sleep apnea and hyperthyroidism. It was reported that in May 2018, she had an operation to remove her thyroid gland.

See also 
 Detention of Michael Spavor and Michael Kovrig
 Sanctions against Iran

References 

1972 births
Living people
Huawei people
China Construction Bank people
Huazhong University of Science and Technology alumni
Chinese women business executives
Chinese chief financial officers
Women chief financial officers
Businesspeople from Chengdu
Canadian extradition case law
Canada–China relations
China–United States relations